Süleyman Başak (born c. 1964) is a financial economist of Turkish Cypriot origin.  He is Professor at the Institute of Finance and Accounting of the London Business School, an MBA-granting part of the University of London and has previously taught at the Wharton School of the University of Pennsylvania until June 30, 2000, where he received the David W. Hauck Award for Outstanding Teaching in 1997, and an honourable mention in 1998 and 1999 for the Geewax, Terker Prize for Investment Research.

Başak received his B.S. degree in Civil engineering from University College London and a master's degree in the same subject from Carnegie Mellon University, This was followed by a M.S. and  Ph.D. in Financial economics from Carnegie Mellon. His dissertation won him the Alexander Henderson Award for excellence in economics, an award also won by Nobel Laureates Oliver Williamson, Dale Mortensen, Finn Kydland and Edward Prescott. He has been the recipient of a Fulbright scholarship, and a William Larimer Mellon Fellowship. He holds research grants from the Economic & Social Research Council, U.K., and the Q-Group, Institute for Quantitative Research in Finance, U.S.

He is Associate Editor of the journals Management Science and Review of Finance.

Selected publications
Başak has published over 17 peer-reviewed papers. His most cited, both dealing with financial economics, are

References

External links
 Personal homepage and CV

1960s births
Living people
Academics of London Business School
Turkish Cypriot emigrants to the United Kingdom
Turkish Cypriot expatriates in the United States
British expatriates in the United States
Alumni of University College London
Wharton School of the University of Pennsylvania faculty
Turkish Cypriot economists
20th-century Turkish  economists
Türk Maarif Koleji alumni
British economists